"Djomb" is a song performed by French singer Bosh, released in 2020. Commercially, it peaked at number one in France and Wallonia. On 9 August, Italian rapper J-Ax released a remix of the song with Fabri Fibra.

Charts

Weekly charts

Year-end charts

Certifications

References

2020 singles
2020 songs
SNEP Top Singles number-one singles
Ultratop 50 Singles (Wallonia) number-one singles
French-language songs
Pop-rap songs